Mirachelus acanthus is a species of sea snail, a marine gastropod mollusk in the family Chilodontidae.

Description
The height of the shell attains  3.7 mm. This species occurs in the Atlantic Ocean off the Bermudas.

References

External links
 To Biodiversity Heritage Library (1 publication)
 To Encyclopedia of Life
 To USNM Invertebrate Zoology Mollusca Collection
 To World Register of Marine Species

acanthus
Gastropods described in 1991